Thylungra Station is a pastoral lease that operates as a sheep station in Queensland.

Description
Neighbouring properties include the Milo and Budgerygar aggregation and Arleun Station that are all owned or leased by George Scott, the current owner of Thylungra. It is situated in the Channel Country on Kyabra Creek, a tributary of Cooper Creek.

The property is predominantly open downs flood-out country with black soils to the south with large areas of gidyea stands interspersed with low sandhills. The north is mostly mulga country with remainder of the property being stony range country. The area is mostly Mitchell grass, Flinders grass, blue grass, bluebush, buttongrass, burr and neverfail on the floodplains. Timbered areas contain stands of gidyea, mulga, coolibah, yarpunyah, bloodwood and supplejack.

History
The traditional owners of the area are the Punthamara people, also rendered Buntamurra, who have inhabited the area for thousands of years.

The name Thylungra is taken from the Buntamurra phrase thillung gurra meaning permanent water, as one of the waterholes in the area was thought to be permanent.

The property was initially established as a cattle station by pioneer Patrick Durack in 1868, along with nearby Kyabra Station.

By 1878 the property had been placed on the market, along with adjoining Bungindery Station.
 
In 1882 Durack left Thylungra to establish Argyle Downs Station in the Kimberley. Half the stock did not survive the journey, which Durack completed nearly two and a half years later.

Thylungra was sold some time in 1884 although Durack had legal action taken against him to recover the commission still owed to the company that sold the property. The purchasers were the Queensland Cooperative Pastoral Company, who placed it on the market when it went into liquidation along with several other properties including Galway Downs, Buckingham Downs and Pikedale in 1886. By 1890 the property was owned by the Thylungra Pastoral Company.

By 1896 the lessee was the Union Bank of Australia and the property was being managed by Henry Roche. The area was in its third year of drought in 1897 with very little feed on the ground. By 1902 the property was almost completely destocked.

At some time prior to 1906 the property had been stocked with sheep. In the same year the property was purchased by John Leahy, Robert Philip and James Forsyth.

Shearers went on strike at Thylungra in 1910 demanding that better equipment be installed before they went back to work. The following year over 100,000 sheep were to be shorn at Thylungra. Leahy died in 1909 and his interest in the property was sold to  Forsythe and Philip.

Thylungra was sold in 1992 by Toni Woods of Goondiwindi to Clyde Agricultural.

In 2008 the Clyde Agricultural Company sold Thylungra for 10.5 million to George Scott in a private sale after it had been passed in at auction a month earlier.

See also
List of ranches and stations

References

Stations (Australian agriculture)
Pastoral leases in Queensland
South West Queensland
1868 establishments in Australia